Crazy Eights is a card game for two to seven players.

Crazy Eights may also refer to:

 Crazy 8 (store), chain of retail stores operated by Gymboree
 Crazy 8s (band), an American band
 Crazy Eights (film) a 2006 horror film
 Crazy8s, a film festival competition in Vancouver
 CSX 8888 incident, a runaway train in Ohio, USA
 Crazy Eight, gang of boys in the novel Spud
 Crazy 8, a villain and enemy of Spider-Man (Gerry Drew)
 Crazy eight, a variation of eight-ball pool
 Crazy Eights (or Crazy 8ths), a  divergent Design Sprint thinking method
 Crazy 8, an item in Mario Kart 8 which carries eight items at once
 The Crazy Eight, nickname for 8th Infantry Division (United States)
 The Crazy Eights, nickname for 8th Canadian Hussars (Princess Louise's)
 Domingo Gallardo "Krazy-8" Molina, the main antagonist of the first half of Season One on Breaking Bad. He also appears on Better Call Saul.

See also

8S (disambiguation)
Crazy (disambiguation)
Eights (disambiguation)